is an East Japan Railway Company (JR East) railway station on the Hanawa Line in the city of Hachimantai, Iwate Prefecture, Japan.

Lines

Station layout
Higashi-Ōbuke Station has a single side platform serving a single bi-directional track. The station is unattended.

History
Higashi-Ōbuke Station opened on December 1, 1960, as a station serving the village of Nishine. The station was absorbed into the JR East network upon the privatization of JNR on April 1, 1987.

Surrounding area
Nambu-Fuji Country Club

See also
 List of Railway Stations in Japan

References

External links

  

Hanawa Line
Railway stations in Japan opened in 1960
Railway stations in Iwate Prefecture
Stations of East Japan Railway Company
Hachimantai, Iwate